HMS Middleton is a  of the British Royal Navy. As of 2021, she forms part of Nine Mine Countermeasures Squadron operating out of HMS Jufair in Bahrain.

The ship was launched by Lord and Lady Blaker in 1983: Lady Blaker remains the patron of the ship.

Operational history
In 2009, Middleton sailed for the Persian Gulf for a three-year deployment operating out of Bahrain, she returned to Portsmouth on 31 August 2012.

In early 2013, Middleton entered refit in Portsmouth, the work package included replacing her 30-year-old Napier Deltic engines with new more fuel efficient Caterpillar C32 ACERT diesels. Following sea trials, Middleton rejoined the fleet in 2014 and took part in that autumn's Exercise Joint Warrior off Scotland.

On 9 November 2015, Middleton sailed from Portsmouth for a second three-year deployment in the Persian Gulf. Alongside sister ship , the two Hunt-class ships form half of the Royal Navy's minehunter force permanently deployed in the region.

In 2018, Middleton returned to the U.K. subsequently undergoing an upgrade to carry the Oceanographic Reconnaissance Combat Architecture (ORCA) system which assists vessels with a higher level of mine detection at greater stand-off distances. In mid-2021, Middleton returned to the Gulf accompanied by HMS Bangor to rejoin the other vessels of 9 Mine Countermeasures Squadron operating out of HMS Jufair. Middleton and Bangor were to relieve their sister vessels HMS Brocklesby and HMS Shoreham, which were to return to the U.K..

Affiliations
 Middleton, Rochdale
 Pendleton Royal Naval Association, City of Salford
 Middleton and Chadderton Sea Cadets - TS Tremadoc Bay
 Rochdale Sea Cadets - TS Frobisher II

References

External links

 

Hunt-class mine countermeasures vessels
1983 ships